Maine Township may refer to:

 Maine Township, Cook County, Illinois 
 Maine Township, Grundy County, Illinois
 Maine Township, Linn County, Iowa
 Maine Township, Otter Tail County, Minnesota
 Maine Township, Adams County, North Dakota

Township name disambiguation pages